This is a list of the 100 largest cities in the U.S. state of California ranked by population, based on estimates for July 1, 2021, by the United States Census Bureau.

Note: The population figures are for the incorporated areas of the listed cities, as opposed to metropolitan areas, urban areas, or counties. Also, the United States Census Bureau and the California Department of Finance use different methods for estimating population, so state estimates will differ from those given here.

Map

See also

List of cities and towns in California
List of cities and towns in the San Francisco Bay Area
List of California urban areas
List of United States cities by population

References

Population
California